Frank Farry (born December 31, 1972) is an American politician. A Republican, he is a member of the Pennsylvania State Senate representing the 6th district since 2023. He previously served in the Pennsylvania House of Representatives representing the 142nd legislative district from 2009-2022.

Career
Before his election to the Pennsylvania House of Representatives, Farry served as assistant township manager for Middletown Township for eight years.  He is also a practicing attorney with the firm of Jackson, Cook, Caracappa, and Bloom in Fairless Hills, Pennsylvania. He is the chief at Langhorne-Middletown Fire Co.

During his time in the House of Representatives, he served on the Consumer Affairs and Human Services committees.

Personal
Farry graduated from Neshaminy High School.  He earned a bachelor of science degree in Economics from the University of Pennsylvania, a master of science in Public Policy from Rutgers University, and his juris doctor from Rutgers University School of Law.

References

External links
Project Vote Smart - Frank Farry (PA)
State Representative Frank Farry official caucus site
Frank Farry (R) official PA House site

|-

Living people
Republican Party members of the Pennsylvania House of Representatives
1972 births
21st-century American politicians
Republican Party Pennsylvania state senators
University of Pennsylvania alumni
Rutgers Law School alumni
Politicians from Bucks County, Pennsylvania